Pseudoclavibacter terrae is a Gram-positive, aerobic, rod-shaped and non-motile  bacterium from the genus Pseudoclavibacter which has been isolated from rhizospheric soil of the plant Ophiopogon japonicus in China.

References

Microbacteriaceae
Bacteria described in 2015